Union Label Group is a record label based in Montreal, Quebec, Canada. It was formed through the merger of the smaller labels Stomp Records, 2112 Records, and Tyrant Records. Mayday! Records was later created as a genre imprint.

Stomp Records was founded in 1994 by Matt Collyer of The Planet Smashers and Jordan Swift of The Kingpins. The label specializes in third wave ska, and was founded to release All-Skanadian Club Volume 1, a compilation of ska and ska punk from across Canada. Soon after that release, The Planet Smashers released their self-titled debut album and The Kingpins released the "On the Run" EP on the label. In 2000, Stomp Records merged with 2112 Records, a Montreal label that specialized in punk rock, to form Union 2112. Tyrant Records released mod revival, garage rock, and new wave music. This imprint has been discontinued. Mayday! Records are dedicated to Canadian street punk.

Artists

Stomp Records
 The Anti-Queens
The BCASA
 Bedouin Soundclash
 Big D and the Kids Table
Bike Thiefs
 The Brains
 Buck-O-Nine
 The Creepshow
Doghouse Rose
 The Dreadnoughts
 Duotang
 The Expos
 The Flatliners
 The Filthy Radicals
 Gangster Politics
 General Rudie
 The Hunters
 Isotopes Punk Rock Baseball Club
 Jah Cutta
 JFK & the Conspirators
 The Johnstones
 Joystick
 K-Man & The 45's
 King Apparatus
 The Kingpins
 The Know How
 Los Kung Fu Monkeys
 The New City Gamblers
 New York Ska-Jazz Ensemble
 One Night Band
 Paul Cargnello
 Raygun Cowboys
 The Peacocks
 The Planet Smashers
 The Resignators
 The Saint Alvia Cartel
 Sarah Blackwood
 Skavenjah
 The Stomp All Stars
 Subb
 The Toasters
 The Undercovers
 Voodoo Glow Skulls
 Westbound Train
 Whole Lotta Milka
 Wine Lips

Union 2112
 Ann Beretta
 Belvedere
 Captain Everything!
 Ceremonial Snips
 Death by Stereo
 Down By Law
 Eric Panic
 Fifty Nutz
 Flashlight Brown
 Men O' Steel
 Misconduct
 My Big Wheel
 Nicotine
 Penelope
 Rentokill
 Reset
 Snitch
 Snuff
 The Frenetics
 The Real Deal
 The Resistance
 The Riptides
 X Large

Mayday Records
 Ripcordz

See also
 List of record labels

References

External links
 Official website

Canadian independent record labels
Quebec record labels
Record labels established in 1994
Ska record labels
Punk record labels